The Moortidevi Award is an Indian literary award annually presented by the Bharatiya Jnanpith, a literary and research organisation. The award is given only to Indian writers writing in Indian languages included in the Eighth Schedule to the Constitution of India, and in English, with no posthumous conferral or self nomination.

From 2003, the award was given to the authors for their "contemplative and perceptive work" and consisted of a cash prize of ₹1 lakh (US$1,600), a citation plaque, a shawl, and a statue of Saraswati, the Hindu goddess of knowledge and wisdom. The first recipient of the award was the Kannada writer C. K. Nagaraja Rao who was honoured in 1983 for his novel, Pattamahadevi Shantala Devi, which was published in four volumes.

Works have been presented the award in ten of the twenty-three eligible languages: Urdu, Telugu, Rajasthani, Marathi and Bengali (one each), Gujarati, Odia and Kannada (two), Malayalam (three) and Hindi (sixteen). No awards were given in 1985 and between 1996 and 1999. The award has been conferred upon twenty-nine writers including one female author: In 1991, Odia academic and writer Pratibha Ray became the first woman to win the award and was honoured for the 1985 novel Yajnasani. Ray and Nirmal Verma have won both the Moortidevi as well as the Jnanpith Award. As of 2019, Hindi writer and professor, Vishwanath Prasad Tiwari is the most recent recipient of the award.

Background
The Bharatiya Jnanpith, a research and cultural institute founded in 1944 by industrialist Sahu Shanti Prasad Jain of the Sahu Jain family, conceived an idea in May 1961 to start a scheme "commanding national prestige and of international standard" to "select the best book out of the publications in Indian languages". In November that year, Rama Jain, the Founder President of the Bharatiya Jnanpith, invited a few literary experts to discuss various aspects of the scheme. Jain, along with Kaka Kalelkar, Harivansh Rai Bachchan, Ramdhari Singh Dinkar, Jainendra Kumar, Jagdish Chandra Mathur, Prabhakar Machwe, Akshaya Kumar Jain, and Lakshmi Chandra Jain, presented the initial draft to the then President of India—Rajendra Prasad who had shown interest in the scheme's implementation. The idea was also discussed at the 1962 annual sessions of the All India Gujarati Sahitya Parishad and the Bharatiya Bhasha Parishad. The award is given in the memory of Moortidevi, mother of Sahu Jain, and was first presented in 1983.

Selection process
Only the work of a living author, published at least one year and at the most ten years before the relevant award year, is considered. The Selection Committee is free to consider any other works besides the proposals submitted to it. No award may be declared for a year if the selection committee does not find any work measuring up to the required standard. The nominations for the award are received from several literary experts, teachers, critics, universities, and numerous literary and language associations. Every three years, an advisory committee is constituted for each of the languages. Each committee consists of three literary critics and scholars of their respective languages.

The Selection Board consists of between seven and eleven members of "high repute and integrity". Each member is part of the committee for a term of three years which can also be extended further for two more terms at most. The recommendations of all language advisory committees are evaluated by the board based on complete or partial translations of the selected writings of the proposed writers into Hindi or English.

Recipients

Notes

See also
 Jnanpith Award

References

Further reading

External links
Official website

Indian literary awards
Awards established in 1983